Marchais may refer to:

Auguste Marchais (1872–1951), French athlete and Olympian
Georges Marchais (1920–1997), French politician
Joséphine Marchais (1837–1874), accused of being a pétroleuse in the Paris Commune

places in France:
Marchais, Aisne, a commune in the department of Aisne
Marchais-en-Brie, a commune in the department of Aisne
Marchais-Beton, a commune in the department of Yonne
Saulx-Marchais, a commune in the department of Yvelines